Mami Wata is a 2023 Nigerian black-and-white fantasy film written and directed by C. J. Obasi, based on West African folklore. The film premiered at the 2023 Sundance Film Festival, marking Obasi's third feature to screen at Sundance.

Cast
 Evelyne Ily Juhen as Prisca
 Uzoamaka Aniunoh as Zinwe
 Kelechi Udegbe as Jabi
 Emeka Amakeze as Jasper
 Rita Edochie as Mama Efe 
 Tough Bone as Ero

Production
Obasi first came up with and began developing Mami Wata in 2016. After penning a few drafts, he took part in a number of labs to help refine the script. In an interview with CNN, Obasi stated he "wanted to make a hyper-stylised film" with its style rooted in substance, taking inspiration from his favourite filmmakers such as Akira Kurosawa and David Lynch. The characters Prisca and Zinwe were inspired by Obasi's late sisters, adding a personal touch to the project. Production companies attached to Mami Wata include Obasi's Fiery Film Company, Palmwine Media, Swiss Fund Visions Sud Est, and Ifind Pictures of France.

Principal photography took place on location in the rural villages of Benin and wrapped in January 2021.

Reception
At the Sundance Film Festival, cinematographer Lílis Soares won the Special Jury Prize in the World Dramatic Competition for the film's cinematography.

References

External links
 

Black-and-white films
Films based on African myths and legends
Films shot in Benin
Nigerian fantasy films